Magpie Creek is a stream in North Dakota, in the United States.

Magpie Creek was named for the magpie birds native to North Dakota.

See also
List of rivers of North Dakota

References

Rivers of Billings County, North Dakota
Rivers of McKenzie County, North Dakota
Rivers of North Dakota